The black-mantled tamarin, Leontocebus nigricollis,  is a species of saddle-back tamarin from the northwestern Amazon in far western Brazil, southeastern Colombia, north-eastern Peru and eastern Ecuador.

There are 3 subspecies:
Spix's black mantle tamarin, Leontocebus nigricollis nigricollis
Graells's tamarin or Graells’ black-mantle tamarin, Leontocebus nigricollis graellsi
Hernandez-Camacho's black-mantle tamarin, Leontocebus nigricollis hernandezi

Graells's tamarin was previously considered to be a separate species.

References

black-mantled tamarin
Mammals of Brazil
Mammals of Colombia
Mammals of Peru
black-mantled tamarin
Taxa named by Johann Baptist von Spix